Like a Flowing River is a 2018 Chinese period drama based on Ah Nai's novel River of Time (大江东去 IPA:). It is directed by Kong Sheng and Huang Wei, and stars Wang Kai, Yang Shuo and Dong Zijian as budding entrepreneurs who take advantage of the economic reforms being rolled out in 1970s China.

The drama is a celebration of 40 years of China's open door policy, and will be split into two parts. The first part will run for 45 episodes, and air on Dragon TV and Beijing TV beginning December 10, 2018. The second part began airing on Dragon TV and Zhejiang TV on December 20, 2020.

Cast

Main

 Wang Kai as Song Yunhui, a naturally gifted man who comes from a family oppressed by the government, since it didn't belong to the peasant class prior to the establishment of PRC. As such, it was difficult for him to rise in the existing system. He grabs hold of the opportunity of the resumption of traditional examination based on academics and eventually becomes a technical engineer.
 Yang Shuo as Lei Dongbao, who is resolute and efficient and comes from a military background. During China's Rural Reform, he leads his whole village in following the government initiatives. However, along the way, he realizes he is tied down by his limited knowledge and world view.
 Dong Zijian as Yang Xun , a self-employed man who scrambles for every little business opportunity, and undergoes several failures, before finally attaining his own business and property.

Supporting

 Tong Yao as Song Yunping, Song Yunhui's sister and Lei Dongbao's wife. A gentle, kind and courageous woman who provides endless support and warmth to her brother and husband. She dies later due to hemorrhaging complications during childbirth.
 Zhou Fang as Cheng Faiyan, Song Yunhui's first wife. She has a daughter with him.
 Yang Caiyu as Liang Sishen, Song Yunhui's pen-pal and close confidante. A beautiful, independent and confident lady. She studied in the USA from a young age and later becomes a business executive. Teenager portrayed by Zhao Yunzhuo.
 Yang Lixin as Clerk Shui
 Zhao Yang as Yu Shanqing
 Wang Hong as Lei Tugen
 Wang Yongquan as Old Clerk
 Tian Lei as Shi Hongwei
 Li Baoan as Song Jishan, Song Yunhui's father
 Qian Jie as Song Yunhui's mother

Production

Shooting 
The "Jin Ling County (晋陵县)" in Like a Flowing River was filmed in Nanjing. As the Yeshan iron ore plant in Nanjing retains the 1970s to 1980s appearance, the building was used for a variety of scenes; scenes of bookstores, photo studios, guest house, government offices, etc. were all shot there. The drama also filmed in Nanjing Yuntai Shan Pyrite Co., Ltd., also in Nanjing, where the crew filmed the mine dormitory, canteen, town hall and children's school, where Song Yunhui taught. The Ministry of Chemical Industry was filmed at Nanjing Art Institute. In order to create a more authentic "Xiao Lei Jia Village (小雷家村)", the crew planted a large tree at the location a year in advance, and spent more than 20 days in the village to shoot.

It is reported that the money used to "restore the texture of the age" was double the amount used in other TV series, with ultra-wide format used for the first time. For the many snow scenes, the crew used naturally degradable paper foam instead of the cheaper magnesium sulfate or aluminum, citing that the old way produced pollution. Actor Wang Kai reportedly lost weight to achieve the look the impoverished main character, while Yang Shuo gained weight to become the well-off secretary of the village.

Principal photography began on February 23, 2018 in Jing County, Xuancheng, Anhui and ended on June 26.

Casting and release 
At Tencent Video VVision Conference held on November 8, 2017, Like a Flowing River was announced, with confirmation of its television broadcast on Dragon TV as a tribute to the 40th anniversary of China's open door policy. Beijing TV also announced its broadcast shortly after. Daylight Entertainment announced Wang Kai as Song Yunhui and Yang Shuo as Lei Dongbao on the 13th and 14th respectively. On December 6, Dong Zijian was cast as Yang Xun.

Original soundtrack 

The main composer of the Like a Flowing River OST is Dong Yingda, who also worked on The Great River (2018) and Ming Dynasty (2019). On December 4, the show held a press conference in Shanghai, and announced that the promotion song of the same name would be sung by Wang Kai.

Reception

Ratings 

 Highest ratings are marked in red, lowest ratings are marked in blue

Awards and nominations

References

External links 
  Like a Flowing River on Weibo 

Television series about China
Television shows based on Chinese novels
Dragon Television original programming
Television series by Daylight Entertainment
Television series by SMG Pictures
2018 Chinese television series debuts
Chinese period television series